(roughly translated as "Light of Shadow") (2006) is a French/Japanese documentary directed by Vincent Guilbert, about the Japanese AV actress Maki Tomoda. It was screened at the Neofest on July 28, 2007 in Tokyo, Japan. The interviewer for the film is Tohjiro, who often directed Tomoda in her videos for the Dogma studio. Also appearing in the film is the famous kinbakushi artist . Music was provided by Tamaru and Installing.

The film was released on DVD-R February 20, 2010 by Taco Che in Tokyo.

Film content
Kage no Hikari (a romanization of the original Japanese title ) is a 47-minute documentary, which focuses on the Japanese adult video (AV) actress Maki Tomoda, who started her career at the age of 30. She expresses her thoughts about her private and professional life before and since she entered the AV industry, delicately sketching the portrait of a woman in her thirties.

References

External links
 Kage no Hikari  at IMDb

Documentary films about actors
Documentary films about women
Japanese documentary films
Documentary films about pornography